Boccia at the 1984 Summer Paralympics consisted of five events.

At the 1984 Summer Paralympics, the first cerebral palsy only sports were added to the program with the inclusion of CP football and boccia.

Medal summary

References 

 

1984 Summer Paralympics events
1984
Paralympics